Sir Thomas Wyatt (150311 October 1542) was a 16th-century English politician, ambassador, and lyric poet credited with introducing the sonnet to English literature. He was born at Allington Castle near Maidstone in Kent, though the family was originally from Yorkshire. His family adopted the Lancastrian side in the Wars of Roses. His mother was Anne Skinner, and his father Henry, who had earlier been imprisoned and tortured by Richard III, had been a Privy Councillor of Henry VII and remained a trusted adviser when Henry VIII ascended the throne in 1509. 

Thomas followed his father to court after his education at St John's College, Cambridge. Entering the King's service, he was entrusted with many important diplomatic missions. In public life, his principal patron was Thomas Cromwell, after whose death he was recalled from abroad and imprisoned (1541). Though subsequently acquitted and released, shortly thereafter he died.  His poems were circulated at court and may have been published anonymously in the anthology The Court of Venus (earliest edition c. 1537) during his lifetime, but were not published under his name until after his death; the first major book to feature and attribute his verse was Tottel's Miscellany (1557), printed 15 years after his death.

Early life
Thomas Wyatt was born at Allington, Kent, in 1503, the son of Sir Henry Wyatt by Anne Skinner, the daughter of John Skinner of Reigate, Surrey. He had a brother Henry, assumed to have died an infant, and a sister, Margaret who married Sir Anthony Lee
(died 1549) and was the mother of Queen Elizabeth's champion, Sir Henry Lee.

Education and diplomatic career
Wyatt was over six feet tall, reportedly both handsome and physically strong. He was an ambassador in the service of Henry VIII, but he entered Henry's service in 1515 as "Sewer Extraordinary", and the same year he began studying at St John's College, Cambridge. His father had been associated with Sir Thomas Boleyn as constable of Norwich Castle, and Wyatt was thus acquainted with Anne Boleyn.

Following a diplomatic mission to Spain, in 1526, he accompanied Sir John Russell, 1st Earl of Bedford, to Rome to help petition Pope Clement VII to annul Henry VIII's marriage to Catherine of Aragon, freeing him to marry Anne Boleyn. Russell being incapacitated, Wyatt was also sent to negotiate with the Republic of Venice.  According to some, Wyatt was captured by the armies of Emperor Charles V when they captured Rome and imprisoned the Pope in 1527, but he managed to escape and make it back to England.

Between 1528 and 1530 Wyatt acted as high marshal at Calais. In the years following he continued in Henry's service; he was, however, imprisoned in the Tower of London for a month in 1536, perhaps because Henry hoped he would incriminate the queen. He was knighted in 1535 and appointed High Sheriff of Kent for 1536. At this time he was sent to Spain as ambassador to Charles V, who was offended by the declaration of Princess Mary's illegitimacy; he was her cousin and they had once been briefly betrothed. Although Wyatt was unsuccessful in his endeavours, and was accused of disloyalty by some of his colleagues, he was protected by his relationship with Cromwell, at least during the latter's lifetime.

Wyatt was elected knight of the shire (MP) for Kent in December 1541.

Marriage and issue
In 1520 Wyatt married Elizabeth Brooke (1503–1560). A year later, they had a son Thomas (1521–1554) who led Wyatt's rebellion many years after his father's death. In 1524, Henry VIII assigned Wyatt to be an ambassador at home and abroad, and he separated from his wife soon after on grounds of adultery.

Wyatt's poetry and influence 
Wyatt's professed object was to experiment with the English language, to civilise it, to raise its powers to equal those of other European languages. A significant amount of his literary output consists of translations and imitations of sonnets by Italian poet Petrarch; he also wrote sonnets of his own. He took subject matter from Petrarch's sonnets, but his rhyme schemes are significantly different. Petrarch's sonnets consist of an "octave" rhyming abba abba, followed by a "sestet" with various rhyme schemes. Wyatt employs the Petrarchan octave, but his most common sestet scheme is cddc ee. Wyatt experimented in stanza forms including the rondeau, epigrams, terza rima, ottava rima songs, and satires, as well as with monorime, triplets with refrains, quatrains with different length of line and rhyme schemes, quatrains with codas, and the French forms of douzaine and treizaine. He introduced the poulter's measure form, rhyming couplets composed of a 12-syllable iambic line (Alexandrine) followed by a 14-syllable iambic line (fourteener), and he is considered a master of the iambic tetrameter.

Wyatt's poetry reflects classical and Italian models, but he also admired the work of Geoffrey Chaucer, and his vocabulary reflects that of Chaucer; for example, he uses Chaucer's word newfangleness, meaning fickleness, in They Flee from Me. Many of his poems deal with the trials of romantic love and the devotion of the suitor to an unavailable or cruel mistress. Other poems are scathing, satirical indictments of the hypocrisies and pandering required of courtiers who are ambitious to advance at the Tudor court.

Wyatt's poems are short but fairly numerous. His 96 love poems appeared posthumously (1557) in a compendium called Tottel's Miscellany. The most noteworthy are thirty-one sonnets, the first in English. Ten of them were translations from Petrarch, while all were written in the Petrarchan form, apart from the couplet ending which Wyatt introduced. Serious and reflective in tone, the sonnets show some stiffness of construction and a metrical uncertainty indicative of the difficulty Wyatt found in the new form. Yet their conciseness represents a great advance on the prolixity and uncouthness of much earlier poetry. Wyatt was also responsible for the important introduction of the personal note into English poetry, for although he followed his models closely, he wrote of his own experiences. His epigrams, songs, and rondeaux are lighter than the sonnets, and they reveal the care and the elegance typical of the new romanticism. His satires are composed in the Italian terza rima, again showing the direction of the innovating tendencies.

Attribution 
The Egerton Manuscript is an album containing Wyatt's personal selection of his poems and translations which preserves 123 texts, partly in his handwriting. Tottel's Miscellany (1557) is the Elizabethan anthology which created Wyatt's posthumous reputation; it ascribes 96 poems to him, 33 not in the Egerton Manuscript. These 156 poems can be ascribed to Wyatt with certainty on the basis of objective evidence. Another 129 poems have been ascribed to him purely on the basis of subjective editorial judgment. They are mostly derived from the Devonshire Manuscript Collection and the Blage manuscript. Rebholz comments in his preface to Sir Thomas Wyatt, The Complete Poems, "The problem of determining which poems Wyatt wrote is as yet unsolved".

Assessment 
Critical opinions have varied widely regarding Wyatt's work. Eighteenth-century critic Thomas Warton considered Wyatt "confessedly an inferior" to his contemporary Henry Howard, and felt that Wyatt's "genius was of the moral and didactic species" but deemed him "the first polished English satirist". The 20th century saw an awakening in his popularity and a surge in critical attention. His poems were found praiseworthy by numerous poets, including Ezra Pound, Marianne Moore, John Berryman, Yvor Winters, Basil Bunting, Louis Zukofsky and George Oppen. C. S. Lewis called him "the father of the Drab Age" (i.e. the unornate), from what he calls the "golden" age of the 16th century. Patricia Thomson describes Wyatt as "the Father of English Poetry".

Rumoured affair with Anne Boleyn 

Many have conjectured that Wyatt fell in love with Anne Boleyn in the early- to mid-1520s. Their acquaintance is certain, but it is not certain whether the two shared a romantic relationship. George Gilfillan implies that Wyatt and Boleyn were romantically involved. In his verse, Wyatt calls his mistress Anna and might allude to events in her life:

And now I follow the coals that be quent,
From Dover to Calais against my mind

Gilfillan argues that these lines could refer to Anne's trip to France in 1532 prior to her marriage to Henry VIII and could imply that Wyatt was present, although his name is not included among those who accompanied the royal party to France. Wyatt's sonnet "Whoso List To Hunt" may also allude to Anne's relationship with the King:

Graven in diamonds with letters plain,
There is written her fair neck round about,
"Noli me tangere [Do not touch me], Caesar's, I am".

In still plainer terms, Wyatt's late sonnet "If waker care" describes his first "love" for "Brunette that set our country in a roar"—presumably Boleyn.

Imprisonment on charges of adultery 
In May 1536, Wyatt was imprisoned in the Tower of London for allegedly committing adultery with Anne Boleyn. He was released later that year thanks to his friendship or his father's friendship with Thomas Cromwell, and he returned to his duties. During his stay in the Tower, he may have witnessed Anne Boleyn's execution (19 May 1536) from his cell window, as well as the executions of the five men with whom she was accused of adultery; he wrote a poem which might have been inspired by that experience.

Around 1537, Elizabeth Darrell was Thomas's mistress, a former maid of honour to Catherine of Aragon. She bore Wyatt three sons. 

By 1540, he was again in the king's favour, as he was granted the site and many of the manorial estates of the dissolved Boxley Abbey. However, he was charged once more with treason in 1541; the charges were again lifted, but only thanks to the intervention of Queen Catherine Howard and on the condition of reconciling with his wife. He was granted a full pardon and restored once again to his duties as ambassador. After the execution of Catherine Howard, there were rumours that Wyatt's wife Elizabeth was a possibility to become Henry VIII's next wife, despite the fact that she was still married to Wyatt. He became ill not long after and died on 11 October 1542 around age 39. He is buried in Sherborne Abbey.

Descendants and relatives 
Long after Wyatt's death, his only legitimate son Sir Thomas Wyatt the Younger led a thwarted rebellion against Henry's daughter Mary I, for which he was executed. The rebellion's aim was to set on the throne the Protestant-minded Elizabeth, the daughter of Anne Boleyn. Wyatt was an ancestor of Wallis Simpson, wife of the Duke of Windsor, formerly King Edward VIII. Thomas Wyatt's great-grandson was Virginia Colony governor Sir Francis Wyatt.

Notes

References

External links 

 
 
 
 Life and works
 Modern English translation of "Whoso List to Hunt"
 
 WYATT, Sir Thomas I (by 1504–42), of Allington Castle, Kent. History of Parliament Online
 

1503 births
1542 deaths
Alumni of St John's College, Cambridge
16th-century English poets
English MPs 1542–1544
High Sheriffs of Kent
Sonneteers
Burials at Sherborne Abbey
Prisoners in the Tower of London
16th-century English diplomats
Latin–English translators
English male poets